This is a list of broadcast television stations that are licensed in the U.S. state of Wyoming.

Full-power stations
VC refers to the station's PSIP virtual channel. RF refers to the station's physical RF channel.

Defunct full-power stations
Channel 6: KSPR-TV - Casper (8/12/1957-7/21/1959)
Channel 7: KJCW - Sheridan (4/2002–12/23/2010)
Channel 11: KBEO - satellite of KPIF - Jackson (3/30/2001-7/16/2010)

LPTV stations

Translators

Wyoming

Television stations